The Vice Chief of the Army Staff (VCOAS) is a statutory position in the Indian Armed Forces usually held by a three star lieutenant general. As the second highest ranking officer to serve in the Indian Army, the VCOAS is the deputy professional head of the Indian Army and a senior adviser to the Minister of Defence. The office holder is usually the second most senior army officer unless the Chief of Defence is an army officer.

Eleven of the forty Vice Chiefs have gone on to head the Indian Army as the Chief of the Army Staff.

The current VCOAS is Lieutenant General M. V. Suchindra Kumar who assumed the office on 1 March 2023. Lt. Gen. Raju's appointment is one of rare instances where an officer has been promoted as Vice Chief without heading any of the Army’s regional commands.

History
In the British Indian Army, the Chief of the General Staff (CGS) assisted the Commander-in-Chief, India.

After the Independence, the CGS remained the number two officer in the Indian Army below the Commander-in-Chief, India. and later the Chief of Army Staff. In January 1959, the post of Deputy Chief of the Army Staff (DCOAS) was created to replace the CGS at the Army HQ. The DCOAS was the second-in-command and was equivalent to an Army Commander (GOC-in-C). 

In January 1965, the CGS post became the Vice Chief of the Army Staff, with the DCOAS becoming a PSO appointment. 

Lieutenant General P.P. Kumaramangalam took over as the first VCOAS.

Order of Precedence
The VCOAS ranks at No. 23 on the Indian order of precedence, along with the Vice Chiefs of Staff of the Indian Navy and Indian Air Force and the Army Commanders (GOC-in-C), Naval Commanders (FOC-in-C) and Air Commanders (AOC-in-C). 

The VCOAS is at the Apex Pay grade (Grade 17), with a monthly pay of ₹225,000 (US$3,200).

Appointment
The Vice Chief of Army staff is appointed by the Appointments Committee of the Cabinet, chaired by the Prime Minister, from among the senior general officers of the Army. Since the appointment is of Commander-in-Chief grade, the  appointees are usually one of the Army Commanders of the seven commands. 

Unlike the Chief of Army Staff, there is no fixed term nor term limit to the position of the VCOAS, although most of those appointed to the office have typically served for two or three year tenures.

Appointees 
The following table chronicles the appointees to the office of the Vice Chief of the Army Staff.

See also
 Chief of the Army Staff
 Vice Chief of the Naval Staff
 Vice Chief of the Air Staff

Notes 
1.Later promoted to the post of General and the Chief of Army Staff.

References 

Indian Army
Vice Chiefs of Army Staff (India)
Vice chiefs of staff
Indian military appointments
Indian Army appointments